This is a list of the Belgian Nobel laureates

See also
 Science and technology in Belgium
Belgian literature

References 

 
Nobel laureates
Belgian